Applied Imagination is an influential 1953 book on creative ideation by Alex Faickney Osborn, in which he introduces the technique of brainstorming.

Chapters
 The all-importance of imagination
 Indispensability of creativity in science
 Careers depend largely on creativity
 Creativity in leadership and professions
 Imagination can improve personal relations
 Universality of imaginative talent
 Ways by which creativity can be developed
 Our new environment - its effect on creativity
 Other factors that tend to cramp creativity
 Creative and non-creative forms of imagination
 The process of ideation vary widely
 Orientation calls for setting our sights
 Preparation and analysis go hand in hand

Editions
 Osborn, Alex F. (1953). Applied Imagination: Principles and Procedures of Creative Problem Solving. New York: Charles Scribner's Sons, 1953.   
Revised edition, New York, Scribner, 1957 
3rd ed. New York C. Scribner 1963 
French translation by Georges Rona and Pierre Dupont, L'Imagination constructive. Principes et processus de la Pensée créative et du Brainstorming, Paris, Dunod, 1959.
Chinese translation by Ikkō Shō, 応用想像力 Taipei : Kyōshi Kōgyō Sōsho Shuppan Kofun Yūgen Kōshi, 1965

References

Creativity
Group problem solving methods
1953 non-fiction books